A pollutant or novel entity is a substance or energy introduced into the environment that has undesired effects, or adversely affects the usefulness of a resource. These can be both naturally forming (i.e. minerals or extracted compounds like oil) or anthropogenic in origin  (i.e. manufactured materials or byproducts from biodegradation). Pollutants result in environmental pollution or become public health concerns when they reach a concentration high enough to have significant negative impacts. 

A pollutant may cause long- or short-term damage by changing the growth rate of plant or animal species, or by interfering with human amenities, comfort, health, or property values. Some pollutants are biodegradable and therefore will not persist in the environment in the long term. However, the degradation products of some pollutants are themselves polluting such as the products DDE and DDD produced from the degradation of DDT.

Pollution has widespread negative impacts on the environment. When analyzed from a planetary boundaries perspective, human society has released novel entities that  well exceed safe levels.

Different types of pollutants in the environment 
Pollutants can be categorized in a variety of different ways.  For example, it is sometimes useful to distinguish between stock pollutants and fund pollutants.  Another way is to group them together according to more specific properties, such as organic, particulate, pharmaceutical, et cetera.  The environment has some capacity to absorb many discharges without measurable harm, and this is called “assimilative capacity (or absorptive capacity); a pollutant actually causes pollution when the assimilative capacity is exceeded.

Stock pollutants
Pollutants, towards which the environment has low absorptive capacity are called stock pollutants. Examples include persistent organic pollutants like PCBs, non-biodegradable plastics and heavy metals. Stock pollutants accumulate in the environment over time. The damage they cause increases as more pollutant is emitted, and persists as the pollutant accumulates. Stock pollutants can create a burden for the future generations, bypassing on the damage that persists well after the benefits received from incurring that damage, have been forgotten. Scientists have officially deemed that the planetary boundaries safe chemical pollutant levels (novel entities) have been surpassed.

Fund pollutants
In contrast to stock pollutants, for which the environment has low absorptive capacity, fund pollutants are those for which the environment has a moderate absorptive capacity. Fund pollutants do not cause damage to the environment unless the emission rate exceeds the receiving environment's absorptive capacity (e.g. carbon dioxide, which is absorbed by plants and oceans). Fund pollutants are not destroyed, but rather converted into less harmful substances, or diluted/dispersed to non-harmful concentrations.

Specific groups of pollutants 
Many pollutants are within the following notable groups:

 Environmental persistent pharmaceutical pollutants (EPPP)
 Greenhouse gases (GHGs)
 Particulate matter (PM)
 Persistent organic pollutants (POPs)
 Polycyclic aromatic hydrocarbons (PAHs)
 Volatile organic compounds (VOCs)

Light pollutant 
Light pollution is the impact that anthropogenic light has on the visibility of the night sky. It also encompasses ecological light pollution which describes the effect of artificial light on individual organisms and on the structure of ecosystems as a whole.

Zones of influence
Pollutants can also be defined by their zones of influence, both horizontally and vertically.

Horizontal zone
The horizontal zone refers to the area that is damaged by a pollutant. Local pollutants cause damage near the emission source. Regional pollutants cause damage further from the emission source.

Vertical zone
The vertical zone refers to whether the damage is ground-level or atmospheric. Surface pollutants cause damage by accumulating near the Earth's surface. Global pollutants cause damage by concentrating on the atmosphere.

Measuring concentration

Regulation

International
Pollutants can cross international borders and therefore international regulations are needed for their control. The Stockholm Convention on Persistent Organic Pollutants, which entered into force in 2004, is an international legally binding agreement for the control of persistent organic pollutants. Pollutant Release and Transfer Registers (PRTR) are systems to collect and disseminate information on environmental releases and transfers of toxic chemicals from industrial and other facilities.

European Union
The European Pollutant Emission Register is a type of PRTR providing access to information on the annual emissions of industrial facilities in the Member States of the European Union, as well as Norway.

United States
Clean Air Act standards. Under the Clean Air Act, the National Ambient Air Quality Standards (NAAQS) are developed by the Environmental Protection Agency (EPA) for six common air pollutants, also called "criteria pollutants": particulates; smog and  ground-level ozone; carbon monoxide; sulfur oxides; nitrogen oxides; and lead. The National Emissions Standards for Hazardous Air Pollutants are additional emission standards that are set by EPA for toxic air pollutants.

Clean Water Act standards. Under the Clean Water Act, EPA promulgated national standards for municipal sewage treatment plants, also called publicly owned treatment works, in the Secondary Treatment Regulation. National standards for industrial dischargers are called Effluent guidelines (for existing sources) and New Source Performance Standards, and currently cover over 50 industrial categories. In addition, the Act requires states to publish water quality standards for individual water bodies to provide additional protection where the national standards are insufficient.

RCRA standards. The Resource Conservation and Recovery Act (RCRA) regulates the management, transport and disposal of municipal solid waste, hazardous waste and underground storage tanks.

See also 

Conventional pollutant - U.S. Clean Water Act
List of environmental issues
Pollutant Standards Index
Pollution

References 

Pollutants
Toxicology
Pollution